Shanghai Institute of Visual Arts (SIVA) (上海视觉艺术学院) is a public university in Songjiang District of Shanghai, China.

SIVA was established in September 2005 with the approval of the Ministry of Education. The school was founded as an art and design school with the efforts by Fudan University, Shanghai Media & Entertainment Group, Wenhui-Xinmin United Press Group, Shanghai Jingwen Investment Ltd., Shanghai Jingwen Properties Group, Shanghai Shenjiao Investment Co., Shanghai World Expo Group, Shanghai Cred Real Estate Stock Co., Emperor Entertainment Group Ltd, The 9 Ltd and Shanda Internet Development. The school had been loosely affiliated with Fudan University; in 2013, the school became a completely independent institute, and is no longer affiliated with Fudan University.

Location
Songjiang University Town, SIVA covers an area of nearly 1,000 mu with a total floor area of 120,000 square meters in Shanghai. The campus consists of academic buildings, information center, practice center, stadium and student cafeteria in place. It is adjacent to the six universities: Shanghai International Studies University; Donghua University; Shanghai Institute of Foreign Trade; Shanghai University of Engineering Sciences; Shanghai Lixin University of Commerce and East China University of Politics and Law. SIVA shares teaching and living resources with Songjiang University Town for faculty and students.

Funding 
State-owned funds account for over 90% of the total investment SIVA has received; the rest comes from social groups.

Academics
SIVA provides a teaching model focused upon professor studios and offers a complete credit system.

The faculty is made up of full-time teachers, visiting professors and part-time teachers as well as honorary professors from home and abroad. SIVA has a developing international platform for working together with international experts on advanced art education.

Guest lecturers and professors include actor Jackie Chan, fresco artist Rainer Maria Latzke, Beowulf and Spider-Man movie animator Sing-Chong Foo, Japanese manga artist Makoto Ogino, the creator of the “Peacock King”, and painters Carlos Morell Orlandis and Piers Maxwell Dudley-Bateman.

Advisory board
The advisory board members include heads of schools of art, such as the Antwerp Royal Academy of Fine Arts,  Planetary Collegium, Central Saint Martins College of Art and Design (Britain), Rhode Island School of Design (the United States), National College of Art (France), The Danish School of Art and Design, the Victorian College of the Arts, the University of Melbourne (Australia), German University of the Arts, Helsinki Institute of Art and Design (Finland), the Hong Kong Academy for Performing Arts, the Hong Kong Polytechnic University, Musashino College of Art and Design (Japan).

Faculty staff
300 full-time teachers

Students
Registered full-time students in the institute approximately number 3,600.

Organization
SIVA includes six subordinate colleges:

Communication Design
Spatial and Industrial Design
Fashion Design
Fine Art
Digital Media
Media and Films

References

External links
 Official website

Universities and colleges in Shanghai
Educational institutions established in 2005
2005 establishments in China